The Tunnel and Reservoir Plan (abbreviated TARP and more commonly known as the Deep Tunnel Project or the Chicago Deep Tunnel) is a large civil engineering project that aims to reduce flooding in the metropolitan Chicago area, and to reduce the harmful effects of flushing raw sewage into Lake Michigan by diverting storm water and sewage into temporary holding reservoirs. The megaproject is one of the largest civil engineering projects ever undertaken in terms of scope, cost and timeframe. Commissioned in the mid-1970s, the project is managed by the Metropolitan Water Reclamation District of Greater Chicago. Completion of the system is not anticipated until 2029, but substantial portions of the system have already opened and are currently operational. Across 30 years of construction, over $3 billion has been spent on the project.

History

19th century
The Deep Tunnel Project is the latest in a series of civil engineering projects dating back to 1834. Many of the problems experienced by the city of Chicago are directly related to its low level topography and the fact that the city is largely built upon marsh or wet prairie. This combined with a temperate wet climate and the human development of open land, leads to substantial water runoff. Lake Michigan was ineffective in carrying sewage away from the city, and in the event of a rainstorm, the water pumps that provided drinking water to Chicagoans became contaminated with sewage. Though no epidemics were caused by this system (see Chicago 1885 cholera epidemic myth), it soon became clear that the sewage system needed to be diverted to flow away from Lake Michigan in order to handle an increasing population's sanitation needs. 

The Illinois and Michigan Canal was built from 1836 to 1848 to divert some sewage water from the Chicago River. In 1900, to improve general health standards, the flow of the main branch of the Chicago River was reversed to drain water from Lake Michigan, as opposed to having the river flow into Lake Michigan. This further improved the sanitation of Lake Michigan, and helped to prevent further waterborne epidemic scares.

Between 1864 and 1867, under the leadership of Ellis S. Chesbrough, the city built the two-mile Chicago lake tunnel to a new water intake location farther from the shore. Crews began from the intake location and the shore, tunneling in two shifts a day. Clay and earth were drawn away by mule-drawn railcars. Masons lined the five-foot-diameter tunnel with two layers of brick. The lake and shore crews met in November 1866, less than seven inches out of alignment. A second tunnel was added in 1874.

20th century
The construction of the Sanitary and Ship Canal (1892–1900), enlargements to the North Shore Channel (1907–1910), the construction of the Cal-Sag Channel (1911–1922), and the construction of locks at the mouth of the Chicago River (1933–1938) brought further improvements to the sanitary issues of the time. These projects blocked further amounts of sewage from draining into Lake Michigan. The projects also brought fresh lake water to inland waterways to further dilute sewage that was already in the waterways.

Surrounding farmland also engaged in flood control projects. The Illinois Farm Drainage Act of 1879 established drainage districts. These districts were generally named for the basin they drained—for example, the Fox River Drainage District. After World War II, suburban communities began to realize the benefits of separating stormwater from sewage water and began to construct separate sewer and storm drainage lines. The primary benefit of wastestream separation is that storm water requires less treatment than sewage before being returned to the environment.

Flood damage grew markedly after 1938, when surrounding natural drainage areas were lost to development and human activity. Serious flooding has occurred in the Chicago metropolitan area in 1849, 1855, 1885, 1938, 1952, 1954, 1957, 1961, 1973, 1979, 1986, 1987, 1996, 2007, and 2008—but most record-setting crests occurred after 1948.

In the 1960s, the concept of Deep Tunnel was studied and recommended as a solution to continuing flooding issues.

Status
Phase 2, creation of reservoirs primarily intended for flood control, remains underway with an expected completion date of 2029.

Additional sewage is stored at the  Thornton Composite Reservoir, and the  Gloria Alitto Majewski Reservoir near O'Hare International Airport. Because the reservoirs are decommissioned quarries, construction has been delayed by decreased demand for the quarried gravel.

Reservoirs

Effects
Severe weather events have forced water management agencies to pump excess wastewater into the lake and river in order to prevent flooding. These incidents have decreased in frequency as more of the Deep Tunnel system has become operational. Long considered an open sewer, the Chicago River now hosts more than 50 species of fish and increased wildlife along its shores. Substantial development is occurring along many portions of the riverfront. Canoeing is once again allowed on the waterway, but swimming is still prohibited due to high pollution levels.

On October 3, 1986, a heavy thunderstorm drenched the southern portion of the Deep Tunnel area with several inches of rain in a short period of time. While the Deep Tunnel system performed satisfactorily by absorbing excess water, water within the system itself rushed past the north side of Chicago and near the Bahá'í Temple in Wilmette. A  geyser erupted downtown at the corner of Jefferson and Monroe, trapping a woman inside her car as it filled with water. A system of watertight bulkheads has since been installed to prevent the event from occurring again.

During the Chicago Flood of 1992, the water from the Chicago River that leaked into the long-disused underground freight tunnel system was eventually drained into the Deep Tunnel network, which itself was still under construction.

Sources

References

External links
 Set of photos of the Morrison Knudsen segment of the tunnel
 Metropolitan Water Reclamation District of Greater Chicago
 Video of TARP on YouTube
 Video of TARP on YouTube
 Article and map in the Encyclopedia of Chicago

Government of Chicago
Buildings and structures in Chicago
Flood control projects
Flood control in the United States
Waste processing sites
Planned developments
Engineering projects
Proposed infrastructure in the United States
Tunnels in Illinois
Proposed tunnels in the United States